Araeolaimida is an order of marine free living nematodes.

References 

 Araeolaimida at WoRMS

 
Nematode orders